Armistice was a Canadian indie pop band, consisting of Montreal singer-songwriter Béatrice Martin, better known by her stage name Coeur de pirate, and Jay Malinowski of Bedouin Soundclash.

History
Martin and Malinowski met at the 2010 Winter Olympics in Vancouver. They began a relationship and started playing music and writing songs. The duo released a five-song EP, Armistice, on February 15, 2011, on Dare to Care Records. The EP's lead single, "Mission Bells", was released to radio in early January.

In addition to Martin and Malinowski, several members of the American punk rock band The Bronx participated in the recording, playing primarily in the mariachi style of their 2009 album Mariachi El Bronx. The album's tracks blended this with Malinowski's alt-rock, Martin's French indie-pop, and a little reggae.

After 2011, Armistice was no longer active due to Béatrice Martin and Jay Malinowski ending their relationship. Martin continues to perform songs which the pair wrote for the album.

Discography

Extended plays

Singles

Music videos

References

External links
 Armistice at MySpace
 

Canadian indie pop groups
Canadian musical duos
Musical groups established in 2010
2010 establishments in Canada